Elizabeth Willis is a poet.

Elizabeth Willis (or variants) is also the name of:

Elizabeth Willis (actress) (1669–1739), British stage actress
Betty Willis (artist) (1923–2015), visual artist and graphic designer
Betty Willis (singer) (1941-2018), American soul singer
Elizabeth Willis, see Crawford's Defeat by the Indians
Liz Willis, presenter on WYMG
Liz Willis, see Libertarian Marxism
Lizzie Ida Grace Willis (1881–1968), NZ military nurse

See also
Beth Willis (disambiguation), multiple uses
Willis (surname)